Methestrol (brand name Meprane) or methoestrol, also known as promethestrol or promethoestrol or as dimethylhexestrol, is a synthetic nonsteroidal estrogen of the stilbestrol group related to diethylstilbestrol which is no longer marketed.

A related drug is methestrol dipropionate (or promethestrol dipropionate) (brand name Meprane Dipropionate).

See also
 Benzestrol
 Dienestrol
 Hexestrol

References

Abandoned drugs
Phenols
Synthetic estrogens